Paul Hendrik van Meenen  (born 29 January 1956 in The Hague) is a Dutch politician of the Democrats 66 (D66) political party. He became a member of the Dutch House of Representatives (Tweede Kamer) on 20 September 2012, after having been elected in the 12 September general election. Prior to being elected he worked as the director for "Spinoza", an organisation of ten VWO high schools in the region of The Hague. He has also served as the leader of the D66 grouping in the municipal council of Leiden since 2002.

References 
  Drs. P.H. (Paul) van Meenen (Parlement & Politiek)

External links 
  Paul van Meenen personal website

1956 births
Living people
Democrats 66 politicians
Dutch political consultants
Leiden University alumni
Members of the House of Representatives (Netherlands)
Municipal councillors of Leiden
Politicians from The Hague
21st-century Dutch politicians
20th-century Dutch people